Erik or Eric Fleming may refer to:
Erik R. Fleming (born 1965), Mississippi politician
Erik Fleming (councilor) (1487–1548), Councilor of State of Sweden
Erik Fleming (director), film director who directed My Brother the Pig
Eric Fleming (1925–1966), American actor
Eric Fleming (footballer) (1903–1984), Australian rules footballer